Hubert's multimammate mouse, or Hubert's mastomys (Mastomys huberti) is a species of rodent in the family Muridae found in Burkina Faso, Gambia, Mali, Mauritania, Nigeria, and Senegal, and possibly Guinea, Guinea-Bissau, and Niger.
Its natural habitats are dry savanna, subtropical or tropical seasonally wet or flooded lowland grassland, arable land, rural gardens, urban areas, irrigated land, and seasonally flooded agricultural land.

References

Sources

Mastomys
Rodents of Africa
Mammals described in 1909
Taxonomy articles created by Polbot